Kaakki is a 2007 Indian Malayalam-language film, directed by Bibin Prabhakar, starring Prithviraj and Mukesh in the lead roles. The film received mixed reviews. The film was shot in Kozhikode.

Cast

Prithviraj as Sub Inspector Unnikrishnan Nair
Mukesh as Head Constable Ramakrishnan Nair
Meera Vasudev as Sethulakshmi, wife of HC Ramakrishnan Nair
Nawab Shah as Parthipan
Nedumudi Venu as Padathuveettil Balakrishnan Nair
 Janardhanan as Bahuleyan
Jagathy Sreekumar as Karunakaran Nair
Mamukkoya as Constable Chekkutty
Chandra Lakshman as Meenakshi
Bindu Panicker as Lathika, mother of Harikrishnan 
Kalabhavan Shajohn as Constable Suraj	
Bheeman Raghu as D.G.P Vikraman
Kundara Johny as S.P Mahesh
P. Sreekumar as Peethambaran, Chairman
Subair as Sugunan, advocate
Santhosh as Sukumaran, member of anti piracy cell 
Santhosh Jogi as Vasudev, party member
Jayan Cherthala as Jayakumar, md blue moon communications
Ponnamma Babu as Padmini
Sudheesh as Harikrishnan
Bindu. C. C as lady constable
 Manasa as TV reporter

References

External links

2007 films
2000s Malayalam-language films
Films shot in Kozhikode
Fictional portrayals of the Kerala Police